Touch Me may refer to:

Albums 
 Touch Me (The Enid album) or the title song, "Elegy (Touch Me)", 1979
 Touch Me (Gary Glitter album), 1973
 Touch Me (Samantha Fox album) or the title song (see below), 1986
 Touch Me!, by Mai Kuraki, or the title song, 2009
 Touch Me, by the Temptations, 1985

Songs 
 "Touch Me" (49ers song), 1989
 "Touch Me" (The Doors song), 1968
 "Touch Me" (Rui da Silva song) featuring Cassandra Fox, 2001
 "Touch Me" (Starley song), 2017
 "Touch Me" (Willie Nelson song), 1962
 "Touch Me" (Yoko Ono song), 1970
 "Touch Me" (Smash song), from the TV series Smash, 2012
 "Touch Me (All Night Long)", by Fonda Rae and Wish, 1984; covered by Cathy Dennis (1991) and Angel City (2004)
 "Touch Me (I Want Your Body)", by Samantha Fox, 1986
 "Touch Me", by Avicii from Stories, 2015
 "Touch Me", by Candyland and Ricci, 2016
 "Touch Me", by Chris Brown from Fortune, 2012
 "Touch Me", by Flo Rida from R.O.O.T.S., 2009
 "Touch Me", by Måneskin, a B-side of "Mammamia", 2021
 "Touch Me", by New Baccara, 1989
 "Touch Me", by PartyNextDoor from Partymobile, 2020
 "Touch Me", by Private Life; covered by Tia Carrere for the Wayne's World soundtrack, 1992
 "Touch Me", by Victoria Monét from Jaguar, 2020
 "Touch Me", from the musical Spring Awakening, 2006

Other media 
 Touch Me (arcade game), an Atari arcade game (1974) and handheld game (1978)
 Touch Me (film), a 1997 American film directed by H. Gordon Boos
 Touch Me (novel), a 2000 novel by James Moloney

See also
 "Touch Me, Touch Me", a 1967 song by Dave Dee, Dozy, Beaky, Mick & Tich
 "Touch-a, Touch-a, Touch-a, Touch Me", a 1973 song from The Rocky Horror Show and its 1975 film adaptation